is a Japanese former football player who last played for Blaublitz Akita.

Club statistics
Updated to 23 February 2016.

References

External links

Profile at Blaublitz Akita

1990 births
Living people
Association football people from Chiba Prefecture
Japanese footballers
J2 League players
J3 League players
Japan Football League players
Ventforet Kofu players
Blaublitz Akita players
AC Nagano Parceiro players
Gainare Tottori players
Association football midfielders